Pyotr Vasilyevich Nikolsky (September 13 [O.S. September 1] 1858 – March 13, 1940) was a Russian dermatologist. He was born in Usman in the Russian Empire and earned his medical degree from the Saint Vladimir Imperial University of Kiev (now Taras Shevchenko National University) in 1884. After graduating, he studied under Mikhail Stukovenkov at the Department of Dermatology and Venerology in Kiev. In 1896, he defended his doctoral thesis on pemphigus foliaceus, in which he described a dermatological condition involving a weakening relationship among the epidermal layers. The sloughing of skin associated with certain varieties of this condition is now referred to as Nikolsky's sign. In 1898, he became a professor at the Imperial University of Warsaw, and later established the Department of Dermatology and Venerology in Rostov at what is now Rostov State Medical University.

He published articles in French as well as Russian on skin diseases and on the treatment of syphilis. He was the author of L'etat de la dermatologie et de la syphiligraphie en Russie jusqu'à 1884 (The State of Dermatology and Syphiligraphy in Russia up until 1884).

References 

 Dictionary of Medical Eponyms by Barry G. Firkin
 BMJ Clinical Evidence (definition of eponym)

1858 births
1940 deaths
People from Usman, Russia
People from Usmansky Uyezd
Russian dermatologists